Jean-Clair Dimitri Roger Todibo (born 30 December 1999) is a French professional footballer who plays as a centre-back for Ligue 1 club Nice.

Club career

Toulouse
Todibo joined the Toulouse in 2016, from FC Les Lilas. He made his Ligue 1 debut on 19 August 2018 against Derby de la Garonne rivals Bordeaux, playing 89 minutes in an eventual 2–1 home win. On 1 September, he was sent off in 26 minutes of a 2–1 win at Guingamp. He played ten games for the club and scored once, a late equaliser on 30 September in a 1–1 draw at Rennes.

Barcelona
On 8 January 2019, Todibo reached an agreement with Barcelona which would see him join them on a free transfer in July 2019, when his contract with Toulouse was due to expire. However, the Spanish side pushed the transfer forward and he joined the club on 31 January 2019. He became the 22nd French player to sign for Barcelona and was handed the number 6 shirt.

Loan to Schalke 04
On 15 January 2020, Todibo was loaned to Bundesliga club Schalke 04 until the end of the season with a buy option for €25 million, plus €5 million in add-ons. In March, Todibo was named Schalke's Player of the Month which was voted by the fans.

Loan to Benfica
On 5 October 2020, Todibo joined Primeira Liga club Benfica on a one-year loan with an option to purchase for €20 million.

Nice
On 1 February 2021, Todibo joined Ligue 1 club Nice on loan with an option to buy after his loan contract was mutually terminated by Barcelona and Benfica. On 27 June, the move was made permanent by the club as they paid €8.5m (+ €7m in variables) to Barcelona. Barcelona also reserved rights to a percentage of his future sale.

On 18 September 2022, he was sent off in a match against Angers after nine seconds, the fastest red card in Ligue 1 history.

International career
Todibo made his international debut for France under-20 on 16 November 2018, in a 1–1 friendly draw with Switzerland in Cartagena, Spain.

In March 2023, he received his first call-up to the France senior national team for the UEFA Euro 2024 qualifying matches against the Netherlands and the Republic of Ireland.

Career statistics

Honours
Barcelona
La Liga: 2018–19

Nice

 Coupe de France runner-up: 2021–22

References

External links

Profile at the FC Barcelona website

1999 births
Living people
Sportspeople from Cayenne
French footballers
France youth international footballers
French Guianan footballers
Association football defenders
Association football midfielders
Toulouse FC players
FC Barcelona players
FC Schalke 04 players
S.L. Benfica footballers
OGC Nice players
Championnat National 3 players
Ligue 1 players
La Liga players
Bundesliga players
French expatriate footballers
Expatriate footballers in Spain
Expatriate footballers in Germany
Expatriate footballers in Portugal
French expatriate sportspeople in Spain
French expatriate sportspeople in Germany
French expatriate sportspeople in Portugal
French people of French Guianan descent
FC Les Lilas players